The Cross of Merit for Bravery is a Polish medal awarded for selfless bravery in the defense of law, national borders, and the life and property of citizens in especially difficult circumstances.

It was established on March 7, 1928 as a military grade of the Cross of Merit. The medal was awarded until World War II and was not recognized by the post-war government. On October 16, 1992 the medal was reintroduced and is currently awarded to police officers, firefighters, and several military and civilian agencies involved in intelligence or security.

The obverse bears the words "Za Dzielność" (Polish: For Bravery) and the letters RP for Republic of Poland.

Orders, decorations, and medals of Poland
Awards established in 1928
Awards established in 1992
1928 establishments in Poland